Sphinx oberthueri is a moth of the family Sphingidae. It is found from central and south-western China to northern Thailand.

The larvae feed on Pinus massoniana in Yunnan.

References

Sphinx (genus)
Moths described in 1903